Saint-Baldoph is a commune in the Savoie department in the Auvergne-Rhône-Alpes region in south-eastern France. It is part of the urban area of Chambéry.

See also
Communes of the Savoie department

References

External links

Official site

Communes of Savoie